Sara Kolak (born 22 June 1995) is a Croatian track and field athlete who competes in the javelin throw. She won gold at the 2016 Summer Olympics. Her personal best of 68.43 m, set in 2017, is the Croatian record. It also ranks her tenth on the overall list.

Career
Kolak won bronze medals at both the European and World Junior Championships. She qualified for the 2016 Summer Olympics, where she won the gold medal, setting a new national record of 66.18 metres. She has since bested her own record, with a 68.43 m throw in 2017. She also won the 2017 European U23 Championship and placed fourth in the final at the 2017 World Championships in London.

Following the 2017 World Championships, Kolak struggled with an elbow injury. The Croatian Olympic Committee approved a $150,000 funding for her surgery, which was carried out in Minnesota, US. After the surgery, she underwent rehabilitation of the ligaments and returned to competition in the summer of 2019.

She has qualified to compete for Croatia at the 2020 Summer Olympics.

International competitions

Awards
 Order of Danica Hrvatska with face of Franjo Bučar - 2016

References

External links
 
 
 
 
 

1995 births
Living people
People from Ludbreg
Sportspeople from Rijeka
Croatian female javelin throwers
Olympic athletes of Croatia
Olympic gold medalists for Croatia
Olympic gold medalists in athletics (track and field)
Athletes (track and field) at the 2016 Summer Olympics
Medalists at the 2016 Summer Olympics
European Athletics Championships medalists
Olympic female javelin throwers
Athletes (track and field) at the 2020 Summer Olympics
20th-century Croatian women
21st-century Croatian women